KF Olimpic is an Albanian football club based in Yrshek, Kashar in the Tirana District. The club was founded in 2002 and was previously called KF Olimpiku Tirana. The club currently not competing in the any senior football league.

Current squad

Affiliated Clubs
  Ionikos FC

External links
Second Division Standings and Stats

Football clubs in Albania
Association football clubs established in 2002
2002 establishments in Albania
Football clubs in Tirana
Albanian Third Division clubs